Případ Z-8 is a 1948 Czechoslovak drama film, directed by Miroslav Cikán. It stars  Josef Bek, Milica Kolofiková, and Jiřina Petrovická.

References

External links
Případ Z-8 at the Internet Movie Database

1948 films
Czechoslovak drama films
1948 drama films
Films directed by Miroslav Cikán
Czechoslovak black-and-white films
1940s Czech films